Shalford is a village and civil parish in the Braintree district of Essex, England. The parish includes the hamlets of Church End, Jasper's Green, and Shalford Green.

The village has a primary school, a village hall, and a 14th-century pub (The George). At the southern end of the village is Stoneley Park, constructed in 1997 from an infilled sand pit and where trees were planted by local residents.

The Tour de France cycle race passed through Shalford on the third and final day of its visit to England, on Monday 7 July 2014, en route from Cambridge to London.

See also
The Hundred Parishes

External links 

 Shalford Parish Council

Villages in Essex
Civil parishes in Essex
Braintree District